David Sesa (born 10 July 1973) is a Swiss football manager and former player. He is the manager of Rapperswil-Jona. A midfielder or forward, he made 36 appearances for the Switzerland national team. He is the current manager of Bellinzona in the Swiss Challenge League.

Club career
Sesa started his career in Switzerland playing for FC Zürich and FC Baden before having his breakthrough during his stint at Servette Geneva. In 1998, he moved to Italy to join Serie B club Lecce, winning promotion to Serie A on his first season. His second season in Italy gained him interest from Napoli, who signed him for 16 billion Italian lira in 2000. His stay at Napoli however turned out to be rather unimpressive, and he suffered relegation with his club on his first season with the Azzurri. He was released by Napoli in 2004, after the club folded due to financial troubles, and returned to Switzerland to play for FC Aarau. In 2005, he returned to Italy, playing in the lower professional tiers with Palazzolo, SPAL and Rovigo before retiring in 2010.

International career
Sesa has played for the Switzerland national team and was a participant at the 1996 UEFA European Championship.

Style of play
Sesa was capable of playing as a right winger or as a second striker, and was considered a fast and elegant forward, despite his lack of particularly notable physical attributes. He was also an accurate free kick taker.

Managerial career
Sesa took his first head coaching job in 2012 as new boss of Swiss Challenge League club FC Wohlen. He was removed from managerial duties in February 2014 due to poor results and replaced with Ciriaco Sforza.

In the summer 2016, Sesa became the assistant manager of his former teammate, René Weiler, at Belgian club R.S.C. Anderlecht. Weiler was fired on 18 September 2017 but Sesa stayed at the club to assist interim manager Nicolás Frutos. However, his contract was terminated in the beginning of the following month.

On 31 August 2019, Sesa was appointed assistant manager of Weiler once again, this time at Egyptian club Al Ahly SC.

On 1 October 2020, Sesa departed Al Ahly following the departure of Weiler.

On 21 June 2022, he was announced as the new head coach of AC Bellinzona in their first season back in the Swiss Challenge League, after achieving promotion in the previous season from the Swiss Promotion League. On 22 August 2022, after only five games with Bellinzona, he resigned from his post.

References

1973 births
Living people
Swiss men's footballers
Swiss expatriate footballers
Swiss expatriate sportspeople in Italy
Servette FC players
FC Aarau players
FC Baden players
Serie A players
Serie B players
Serie C players
U.S. Lecce players
S.S.C. Napoli players
Expatriate footballers in Italy
UEFA Euro 1996 players
FC Zürich players
Switzerland international footballers
S.P.A.L. players
Swiss Super League players
Rovigo Calcio players
Swiss-Italian people
Swiss people of Italian descent
Swiss football managers
FC Wohlen managers
Association football midfielders
Footballers from Zürich
AC Bellinzona managers